John Collier Calhoun (May 19, 1925 – August 27, 2010) was an American diver. He competed in the men's 10 metre platform event at the 1952 Summer Olympics.

References

External links
 
 

1925 births
2010 deaths
American male divers
Olympic divers of the United States
Divers at the 1952 Summer Olympics
Sportspeople from Decatur, Illinois